Sasa Macura is an Australian football (soccer) player who plays as a midfielder for Manly United in the National Premier Leagues NSW.

Born in Australia, Macura played youth football for Northern Tigers, APIA Leichhardt and Bonnyrigg White Eagles before moving to Hungary. There, he made his professional debut for MTK Budapest as well as playing in the Nemzeti Bajnokság II for MTK's reserve team and Szigetszentmiklósi. In 2014, he returned to Australia to play for Blacktown City. He moved to Manly United in 2017.

Early life 
Macura was born in Knin, Croatia. He moved to Sydney as a child and attended Narrabeen Sports High School. He first played football for Dee Why Swans on Sydney's Northern Beaches.

Club career 
Macura played youth football for Northern Tigers FC, APIA Leichhardt Tigers and Bonnyrigg White Eagles.

Aged 18, Macura moved to Europe, initially to trial with Serbian club FK Vojvodina, where he was offered a contract. However, on the advice of his manager, Macura instead accepted a contract with Hungarian Nemzeti Bajnokság I club MTK Budapest. He made his competitive first-team debut for MTK in the 2010–11 Ligakupa in a loss to fellow top-tier side Vasas in July 2010. In early 2013, Macura moved on loan to Szigetszentmiklósi in the Nemzeti Bajnokság II.

In 2014, Macura returned to Sydney to play for Blacktown City in the National Premier Leagues NSW.

References

External links
 

1991 births
Living people
Australian soccer players
Association football midfielders
MTK Budapest FC players
Szigetszentmiklósi TK footballers
Blacktown City FC players
Manly United FC players
National Premier Leagues players
Croatian emigrants to Australia
Sportspeople from Knin
Serbs of Croatia
Expatriate footballers in Hungary
Australian expatriate sportspeople in Hungary